Cycas conferta is a species of cycad.
It is native to rocky areas of the Northern Territory in Australia, including Kakadu National Park.

References

conferta
Plants described in 1993